The Social Democratic Party (PS) is a social-democratic political party in Andorra.

History
The party was established in the run-up to the March 2001 parliamentary elections when the National Democratic Group split in two, with the Democratic Party also being formed. The new party received 28.7% of the vote and won six seats.

In the buildup to the April 2005 parliamentary elections the party formed an alliance named L'Alternativa with the Parochial Union of Independents Group (GUPI) and Democratic Renewal to contest parish-level seats. The party won six seats at the national level, whilst the alliance won six seats at the parish level. With a total of twelve seats, the party remained in opposition.

The April 2009 parliamentary elections saw the party renew its alliance with GUPI and some independents. The alliance won 14 of the 28 seats and PS leader Jaume Bartumeu became Prime Minister, with the Andorra for Change party supporting the government.

In 2010 the APC withdrew its support for the PS-led government, and in 2011 the General Council rejected the government's budget, forcing early elections. The  April 2011 parliamentary elections saw the PS receive 34.8% of the vote, reducing its representation to six seats.

In the March 2015 parliamentary elections, the party ran in alliance with the Greens of Andorra, Citizens' Initiative and independent candidates. The alliance's vote share fell to 24%, winning only three seats.

Election results

General Council elections

Local elections

Members
Some notable past and present members are:
 Jaume Bartumeu, Prime Minister from 2009 to 2011
 Carles Blasi Vidal
 Josep Dallerès Codina
 Jordi Font Mariné
 Pere López Agràs, Prime Minister 2011
 Maria Pilar Riba Font, sat on General Council from 2005 to 2011

References

External links

Official website

Parties related to the Party of European Socialists
Political parties in Andorra
Social democratic parties
Full member parties of the Socialist International
2000 establishments in Andorra
Political parties established in 2000
Social democratic parties in Europe
Socialism in Andorra